Baptiste Delaporte (born 27 March 1997) is a French rugby union flanker and he currently plays for Castres Olympique.

International career
Delaporte was part of the French squad for the 2020 Six nations.

References

External links
Baptiste Delaporte on ESPN scrum

1997 births
Living people
French rugby union players
Castres Olympique players
Rugby union flankers
Sportspeople from Tarn (department)
French people of Martiniquais descent